Dance Music (German:Tanzmusik) is a 1935 Austrian drama film directed by Johann Alexander Hübler-Kahla and starring Liane Haid, Gusti Huber and Hermann Thimig.

Cast
 Liane Haid as Gina Harding  
 Gusti Huber as Hedi Baumann  
 Hermann Thimig as Mario d'Almeida  
 Leo Slezak as Koppler, Inhaber einer Konzertagentur  
 Georg Alexander as Bob Crawler  
 Hans Thimig as Franz Hegner  
 Rudolf Carl as Jim, Diener d'Almeides  
 Ferdinand Mayerhofer as Baumann, Weinhändler  
 Eduard Loibner as Ein Manager  
 Richard Eybner as Inhaber einer Tanzschule

References

Bibliography 
 Waldman, Harry. Nazi Films In America, 1933-1942. McFarland & Co, 2008.

External links 
 

1935 films
Austrian drama films
Austrian black-and-white films
1935 drama films
1930s German-language films
Films directed by Johann Alexander Hübler-Kahla